A ting (亭) was an administrative unit during the Qin and Han dynasties, 10x10 li in area. The most famous former Ting leader was Liu Bang, founder of the Han dynasty.

The Qin- and Han-era ting (亭) should not be confused with the unrelated ting (廳; simplified, 厅) of the Qing dynasty. The latter is often translated as subprefecture.

See also
 History of the administrative divisions of China

Types of administrative division
Administrative divisions of ancient China